Trần Quốc Cường (born 27 July 1974 in Hải Dương) is a Vietnamese sport shooter. He has qualified to represent Vietnam at the 2016 Summer Olympics in the 10m air pistol and 50m pistol disciplines.

References

External links
 

ISSF pistol shooters
Living people
Vietnamese male sport shooters
Olympic shooters of Vietnam
Shooters at the 2016 Summer Olympics
Shooters at the 2002 Asian Games
Shooters at the 2006 Asian Games
Shooters at the 2010 Asian Games
Shooters at the 2014 Asian Games
Shooters at the 2018 Asian Games
Asian Games bronze medalists for Vietnam
Medalists at the 2006 Asian Games
Medalists at the 2014 Asian Games
Medalists at the 2018 Asian Games
Asian Games medalists in shooting
Southeast Asian Games gold medalists for Vietnam
Southeast Asian Games bronze medalists for Vietnam
Southeast Asian Games medalists in shooting
Competitors at the 2007 Southeast Asian Games
Competitors at the 2011 Southeast Asian Games
Competitors at the 2013 Southeast Asian Games
Competitors at the 2015 Southeast Asian Games
Competitors at the 2019 Southeast Asian Games
1974 births
People from Hải Dương province
Competitors at the 2021 Southeast Asian Games
20th-century Vietnamese people
21st-century Vietnamese people